Hagersville is a community in Haldimand County, Ontario in Canada.

Location and airports
Hagersville's nearest airports are Hamilton/John C. Munro International Airport (CYHM) (formerly Mount Hope Airport), Toronto Pearson International Airport (YYZ), and Buffalo Niagara International Airport (BUF).

Demographics and area

Hagersville's 2016 population was 2,815, a 14% growth from the 2011 population of 2,579.
Of the total population, 87.5% are European, 9% are First Nation and 3.5% are visible minorities (mostly Filipino, South Asian and Latin American).

Hagersville is adjacent to Mississaugas of the Credit and Six Nations of the Grand River First Nation reserves.

Notable people
 Hagersville was the birthplace of Neil Peart (1952–2020), drummer of the Canadian rock group Rush.
 Hagersville is the birthplace of Becky Kellar-Duke, b. 1 January 1975, who is a 4 time Olympian with 3 gold medals and 1 silver in Women's Hockey.
 Hagersville is the birthplace of Carl Reid, b. 14 December 1950, Roman Catholic priest, who is Ordinary of the Personal Ordinariate of Our Lady of the Southern Cross in Australia.
 Hagersville was the birthplace of Jay Silverheels (1912–1980), who played Tonto in the 1950s television series The Lone Ranger.
 Hagersville is home to the Hagersville Hawks, a junior hockey team that plays in the Niagara & District Junior C Hockey League.

History

Upon the construction of Highway 6, known formerly as the Plank Road, a small village popped up around 1855 when Charles and David Hager bought most of the land in the centre of the area. David Almas owned the land on the east side of the road, while John Porter owned the land in the west end.

The building of the Canada Southern Railroad in 1870, and of the Hamilton and Lake Erie Railway three years later helped to make Hagersville a prosperous village in 1879.

Close by the rail crossing was The Junction Hotel, later becoming The Lawson Hotel after a change in ownership. Perhaps it was best known as Murph's Place when retired NHL player Ron Murphy took ownership. It was also known as the Hagersville Inn, but today it is known as The Old Lawson House. In 1852, Charles Hager built a frame hotel at the corner of the Plank Road and Indian Line. Hagersville's first post office was in this hotel and Joseph Seymour suggested the community be called Hagersville to honour the Hager brothers.  As of 2020, the Lawson property offered rooms as affordable housing for many residents.

No. 16 SFTS opened on 8 August 1941 and closed on 30 March 1945. After the RCAF finished with the site it was used by the Canadian Army for various purposes and was known as Camp Hagersville. The camp was closed in 1964. Between the 1960s and 1990s, the camp was used as a residence for youth and then a flea market. As of 2013 the site was an industrial park. Some of the military homes are still there, and the housing area is known as "White Oaks Village". A good view of the site and the old hangars is had from Concession 10 Walpole.

In 1990, a large uncontrolled tire fire emitted fumes of toxic smoke into the atmosphere for seventeen days. The fire itself occurred in Townsend, a neighbouring community, but media credited it to Hagersville due to Townsend's relatively unknown status in the area. The so-called "Hagersville Tire Fire" has reportedly been linked to long-term health issues, including some "rare, aggressive cancers," among firefighters who experienced the event first-hand.

Climate

Education
Grand Erie District School Board operates Hagersville Secondary School.  Two elementary schools are in Hagersville: Hagersville Elementary School (operated by Grand Erie District School Board) and St. Mary's School, a Catholic elementary school (operated by Brant Haldimand Norfolk Catholic District School Board).

References

External links

 Haldimand County

Communities in Haldimand County
BCATP
Military history of Canada during World War II